Ciutat de Tarragona Trophy is a football (soccer) tournament played annually in Tarragona (province of Tarragona, Catalonia, Spain).

The tournament started in 2007.

Ciutat de Tarragona Trophy

Gimnàstic de Tarragona
Catalan football friendly trophies
2007 establishments in Catalonia